Bawdy House Riots or Bawdyhouse Riots can mean:
 the Bawdy House Riots of 1668 in London
 the New York Bawdyhouse Riots of the 1790s
 the Boston Bawdyhouse Riots of 1825